= Swiss Ecclesiastical Chant Federation =

The Swiss Ecclesiastical Chant Federation (SECF) (in German Schweizerischer Kirchengesangsbund (SKGB), in French Fédération Suisse du Chant Ecclésiastique (FSCE), in Italian Federazione Svizzera del Canto Sacro (FSCS), in Romansh Federaziun Svizra dal Chant Sacral (FSCS) is the umbrella organisation of church choirs and chantries as well as of ecclesiastical and sacred music in general in Switzerland.

The SECF has been founded in 1896 as federation of the Swiss-German choirs of the reformed churches. It has about 10000 members in about 325 choirs.
